Cyclostrema supremum is a species of sea snail, a marine gastropod mollusk in the family Liotiidae.

Description
The height of the shell attains 1.5 mm and its diameter 4 mm. The white shell has a plane-discoidal shape with 5 whorls. The species is beautifully cancellate and sculptured, though more or less smooth below the periphery and around the narrow but deep umbilicus. The whorls are all channeled at the sutures, very distinct (seen with a lens) on the two apical whorls. The penultimate whorl contains one keels and the body whorl three keels. The oblique aperture is oval.

Distribution
This species occurs in the subtidal zone of the Persian Gulf

References

 Trew, A., 1984. The Melvill-Tomlin Collection. Part 30. Trochacea. Handlists of the Molluscan Collections in the Department of Zoology, National Museum of Wales.

External links
 To World Register of Marine Species

supremum
Gastropods described in 1903